Concordia University is a public university in Montréal, Quebec.

Concordia University, College or Seminary may also refer to:

Canada
 Concordia University of Edmonton, in Alberta, formerly Concordia College and Concordia University College of Alberta
 Concordia Lutheran Theological Seminary, in St. Catharines, Ontario, of the Lutheran Church–Canada
 Concordia Lutheran Seminary in Edmonton, Alberta, of the Lutheran Church–Canada

United States

Lutheran Church–Missouri Synod
 Seminaries of the Lutheran Church – Missouri Synod
 Concordia Seminary in Clayton, Missouri
 Concordia Theological Seminary in Fort Wayne, Indiana
 Concordia Senior College (1953–1977), whose campus is now the Concordia Theological Seminary campus
 California Concordia College (1906–1973), in Oakland, California
 Concordia College (Indiana) (closed 1957), in Fort Wayne
 Concordia College (North Carolina) (closed 1935), in Conover

 Concordia University System
 Concordia University Ann Arbor, Michigan
 Concordia University Chicago, Illinois
 Concordia University Irvine, California
 Concordia University Nebraska, in Seward
 Concordia University, St. Paul, Minnesota
 Concordia University Texas, in Austin
 Concordia University Wisconsin, in Mequon
 Concordia College (New York) (closed 2021), in Bronxville
 Concordia College Alabama (closed 2018), in Selma
 Concordia University (Oregon) (closed 2020), in Portland
 Concordia University School of Law (closed 2020), in Boise, Idaho

Other institutions in the United States
 Concordia College (Moorhead, Minnesota), affiliated with the Evangelical Lutheran Church in America
 Concordia College and University, an unaccredited institution
 Seminex, or Concordia Seminary in Exile (1974–1987), in St. Louis, Missouri

Other countries
 Concordia College (South Australia) in Highgate, Adelaide
 Concordia Lutheran College in Toowoomba, Queensland, Australia
 Concordia International University Estonia, in Tallinn 
 Concordia College (Namibia), in Windhoek
 Concordia College Manila, Philippines

See also
 
 Concordia (disambiguation)
 Concordia Academy (disambiguation)
 Concordia High School (disambiguation)
 Concordia Lutheran High School (disambiguation)
 Cloud County Community College in Concordia, Kansas, U.S.
 Concordia Language Villages
 Concordia Normal School (closed 1878)
 Concordian International School, in Bangkaew, Samutprakarn, Thailand
 Great Western Business and Normal College, or Concordia Normal School and Business College, Concordia Business College, in Concordia, Kansas, U.S. (closed 1930s)